Idalus vitrea is a moth of the family Erebidae. It was described by Pieter Cramer in 1780. It is found in Mexico, Guatemala, Honduras, Costa Rica, Panama, Paraguay, Peru, French Guiana, Bolivia, Brazil, and Venezuela.

Subspecies
Idalus vitrea vitrea (French Guiana, Brazil, Venezuela, Bolivia, Panama, Costa Rica, Guatemala, Honduras, Mexico)
Idalus vitrea borealis (Rothschild, 1909) (Mexico, Guatemala, Costa Rica, Honduras)
Idalus vitrea meridionalis (Rothschild, 1909) (Paraguay)
Idalus vitrea occidentalis (Rothschild, 1909) (Peru)

References

 

vitrea
Moths described in 1780
Moths of South America